Anthony John Benneworth (12 December 1950 – 10 March 2018) was an Australian cricketer who played for Tasmania from 1971 until 1979. He was a right-handed batsman and a right-arm medium-pace bowler.

He played in Tasmania's inaugural Sheffield Shield team in 1977–78. He was the first Tasmanian to take five wickets in an innings in a Sheffield Shield match, when he took 5 for 115, as well as making 54 and 42, against South Australia in February 1978.

Benneworth was the Liberal candidate for Bass in the 2001 federal election but lost to Labor's Michelle O'Byrne. From 1992 to 1998 he served in the Tasmanian House of Assembly.

He died in a boating accident off Ansons Bay, Tasmania on 10 March 2018.

See also
 List of Tasmanian representative cricketers

References

External links

1950 births
2018 deaths
Australian cricketers
Tasmania cricketers
Australian sportsperson-politicians
Members of the Tasmanian House of Assembly
Liberal Party of Australia members of the Parliament of Tasmania
Cricketers from Launceston, Tasmania